The 1986–87 Women's Basketball European Cup was the 29th edition of the competition. The final took place in Thessaloniki on 12 March 1987 and confronted defending champion AS Vicenza and 1986 Ronchetti Cup champion Dynamo Novosibirsk, with the Italians winning their third European Cup in a row, an overall fourth.

Qualification round

Round of 16

Group stage

Group A

Group B

Semifinals

Final

References

Champions Cup
EuroLeague Women seasons